Planernaya is a Moscow Metro station. It opened on December 30, 1975 as the final section of the northern extension of the Krasnopresnensky radius.

It is not to be confused with Planernaya Railway Platform on the Moscow-St Petersburg Railway  to the North and on the other side of Khimki.

Location

Planernaya metro station is located at Planernaya Street in Moscow's Severnoye Tushino District. It is the northwestern terminus of the Tagansko-Krasnopresnenskaya Line. The station was the northernmost in the Metro system until the opening of Medvedkovo in 1978.  To the north of the station is the Planernoye depot, which opened with the extension (and hence relieved Krasnaya Presnya).

Building
The architect Trenin faced the pillars with white marble and the floor with black granite. The station walls are decorated with geometric patterns formed from white, blue-grey, and yellow shades. This gives the station a very bright appearance.

Entrances / exits
The station has two surface vestibules which lead to Fomicheva and Planernaya streets.

References

External links
metro.ru
mymetro.ru
KartaMetro.info — Station location and exits on Moscow map (English/Russian)

Moscow Metro stations
Railway stations in Russia opened in 1975
Tagansko-Krasnopresnenskaya Line
Railway stations located underground in Russia